Miss Universe 1960, the 9th Miss Universe pageant, was held on 9 July 1960 at the Miami Beach Auditorium in Miami Beach, Florida, United States. Linda Bement of United States became the third American to win the crown and was handed over the title by Akiko Kojima of Japan.

Results

Placements

Contestants

  - Rose Marie Lincke
  - Elizabeth Hodacs
  - Huberte Bax
  - Nancy Aguirre
  - Jean Gina MacPherson
  - Myint Myint May
  - Edna Dianne McVicar
  - Marinka Polhammer Espinoza
  - Stella Márquez
  - Leila Rodríguez
  - Flora Lauten Hoyos
  - Lizzie Ellinor Hess
  - Isabel Rolando Ceballos
  - Joan Ellinor Boardman
  - Maija-Leena Manninen
  - Florence Anne Marie Normand Eyrie
  - Ingrun Helgard Moeckel
  - Magda Passaloglou
  - Carina Verbeek
  - Vivian Cheung
  - Svanhildur Jakobsdóttir
  - Aliza Gur
  - Daniela Bianchi
  - Yayoi Furuno
  - Helen Giatanapoulus
  - Sohn Miheeja
  - Gladys Tabet
  - Marie Venturi
  - Marilyn Escobar
  - Lorraine Nawa Jones
  - Ragnhild Aass
  - Mercedes Teresa Ruggia
  - Medallit Gallino
  - Maria Teresa Motta Cardoso
  - Nicolette Joan Caras
  - María Teresa del Río
  - Christine Jie Sam Foek
  - Birgitta Öfling
  - Elaine Maurath
  - Marie Louise Carrigues
  - Iris Teresa Ubal Cabrera
  - Linda Jeanne Bement †
  - Mary Quiróz Delgado

Notes

Replacement
  —   Antje Moller was dethroned  at 16 years old and was replaced by Lizzie Ellinor Hess.

Did not compete
  - Sale Assouen
  - Claudinette Fourchard
  - Lorena Velásquez
  - Marzena Malinowska
  - Maria Flohr

Awards
  - Miss Amity (Myint Myint May)
  - Miss Photogenic (Daniela Bianchi)

General references

References

1960
1960 in Florida
1960 beauty pageants
Beauty pageants in the United States
July 1960 events in the United States
Events in Miami Beach, Florida